Quail Springs Mall is a super-regional shopping mall and trade area located in far northern Oklahoma City, Oklahoma. It contains three major department store anchors, a 24-screen AMC Theatre, and a total of 111 tenants comprising a total of approximately 1,115,000 square feet of gross leasable area. The mall is the focal point of a large area of recent residential and commercial development, and is located very close to one of Oklahoma City's most notoriously congested and difficult intersections which includes West Memorial Road, North Pennsylvania Avenue and The Kilpatrick Turnpike.

Architect William Pereira designed the original building. The mall itself was built by DayJay Associates, a joint venture of J. C. Penney and The Center Companies, a division of the Dayton-Hudson Corporation (now Target Corporation). The mall underwent a multimillion-dollar renovation during 1998 that brought several exterior updates, completely redesigned the mall's interior style into an Oklahoma prairie theme, updated the lower-level food court to a 1950s drive-in design, plus added the 24-screen AMC Theatre adjacent to the food court.

The mall's anchor stores are Life Time Fitness, JCPenney, AMC Theatres, Von Maur, and Dillard's. Former anchors include Foley's, Sears, & Macy's. In January 2017, it was announced that the Macy's building would be demolished and that Life Time Fitness would build a huge 181,400-sq.-ft. complex in the former Macy's general location. Life Time Fitness opened in October 2018. Round One has now opened.

References

External links
Quail Springs Mall home page

Shopping malls established in 1980
Brookfield Properties
Shopping malls in Oklahoma
Buildings and structures in Oklahoma City
Economy of Oklahoma City
William Pereira buildings
Tourist attractions in Oklahoma City
1980 establishments in Oklahoma